Jean-Paul Lilienfeld (born 17 July 1962) is a French actor, writer and director. His film, La journée de la jupe, was nominated for three César Awards in 2009, including Best Film and Best Original Screenplay for Lilienfeld.

Director filmography
Il n'y a guère que les actions qui montent (1990) (short)
Seventh Heaven (De zevende hemel) (1993)
XY, drôle de conception (1996)
Quatre garçons pleins d'avenir (1997)
HS - hors service (2001)
La journée de la jupe (2009)
Arrêtez-moi  (2012)

Actor filmography
 L'été en pente douce (1987)
 La vie est à nous ! (2005)

References

External links

French male screenwriters
French screenwriters
French male film actors
French film directors
Living people
1962 births
Place of birth missing (living people)